Mistaken Island is an island located approximately  south-east of Albany, Western Australia.

There is evidence that shore-based bay whaling activities were conducted on the island in the 19th century.

The area adjacent to the island is used to cultivate mussels on long lines on licenses issued by the Department of fisheries and leases issued by the Albany Port Authority.

Little penguin colony 
The island received its name for the little penguin (Eudyptula minor) burrows which were mistaken for rabbit holes and the island has also been historically referred to as Rabbit Island. In 1936 and 1938, the penguins of Mistaken Island became victims of deliberately lit fires. Following the latter event, some were discovered with their feet "burned off". As of 2011, the penguin colony on Mistaken Island is the subject of scientific study.

References

Nature reserves in Western Australia
Islands of the Great Southern (Western Australia)
Albany, Western Australia
Whaling stations in Australia